Uttam Mohanty is an Indian Odia film and television actor who has to his credit more than 135 Odia films to date and has acted in 30 Bengali films and in a Hindi film Naya Zaher.

Early life
Uttam Mohanty was born and brought up in Baripada, Odisha. His grandfather settled in Baripada 150 years ago. He completed his early education from M.K.C. High School. As a child he was very naughty which brought fresh complaints from outside. After matriculation he joined Maharaja Purnachandra College, Baripada for his intermediate and bachelor's in science. During his college days he was inclined more towards acting. He always tried to play the lead part in dramas. He was equally passionate to sports like badminton and table tennis. After completing graduation, he went to Ludhiana for chartered accountancy. Thereafter he stayed with his elder brother, the late Arun Ku. Mohanty, in Kolkata for some time, enrolled in a chartered accountancy course there. Till now he is closely associated with Baripada.

Life and career

Knowing that a film named Abhiman was being made in Baripada, he returned home with a hope of trying his luck in films. Though there were many contenders for the lead role, the director Sadhu Meher had a special interest in his capability and looks. He was selected. Co-actress Rita Chand was also debuting in that film. On the day of shooting he turned up to the set well-dressed with best possible suits available. Sadhu told him to take the make-up of a poor guy. He was sent again to come back with old and dirty clothes and without make-up. The 1977 film was a box office hit.

Uttam now opted seriously for being an actor, and slowly stabilised his position in the Odia film industry. While staying in Kolkata he got an offer from director Dhir Biswal for his upcoming film titled Gouri. Later that role was given to Prasanta Nanda. The next film he did was "Pati Patni" opposite Mahasweta Ray. Then a streak of films like "Nijhum ratira sathi", "Chinha Achhinha", "Ramayana", Tapasya, Ram Balram happened. By the time he was established as a romantic star.Uttam Mohanty was especially adored for his effortless naturalism in front of the camera and a distinctively urbane charisma that broke free from the prototypical Odia screen hero of the past. He went on to form successful screen pairs with many leading ladies like Rita Chand, Sujata Ananda, Tandra Roy, Mahasweta Ray, Deepa Sahu, Subhra Pati, Aparajeeta, Baisali, Sangeeta Das even Rachana Benerjee and other non Odia actress. Often hailed as the one-man industry, Uttam Mohanty dominated Odia cinema for three decades. The 1980s were the pinnacle of his career. Many Ollywood films of the 1980s had Uttam Mohanty in them, and he dominated the Odia film industry. He excelled in various roles: Romantic, Village Lad, Character. Abhiman, Danda Balunga, Bhakta Salabega are even remembered today for his stupendous acting. He also worked in around 30 Bengali films and one Hindi film - Naya Jahar, opposite Satabdi Roy.

In the early eighties he played in almost 20 movies opposite leading actress Mahasweta Ray (Rasmi Ray). Though they fell in love and decided to marry, the love did not last long, and the pair separated. "Palatak" (1985) was their last film. Again the pair was hit in 1988 by Prashanta Nanda in the film of "Ja Devi Sarbavutesu". Later both came in lot of films in nineties. Over fifty of his films are opposite Aparajita Mohanty, his wife. They first appeared together in Astaraga (1982), and married on 17 May 1987 in Municipality Guest House, Bhubaneswar. Other heroines who have acted opposite him include Anita, Sujata, Tandra, Deepa, Baisali, Subhra Pati, and Rachana Bannerje.

After 1995 he got more character roles due to his age. In films like "Jashoda", "Subhadra", Kalamanika he did character roles. In the later period of his career he also took television roles. Serials like 'Je Pakhi Ude Jete Dura', 'Sara Akash', Panatakani and 'Uttaradayi' are most popular. His role as Bikhu bhai in Sara Akash is memorable. His Hindi serials include Palash and Bengali serial bideshini Bohu. His has also contributed to music albums and Bhajaans.

Uttam Mohanty now lives in Bhubaneswar. Currently, he is working for Odia tele-serials and movies, and interested in enhancing his knowledge in the area of politics. He and Aparajita Mohanty have a son named Babushan Mohanty who has established himself as one of the leading Ollywood heroes post 2010 era.

Uttam Mohanty is the only star in the Odia cinema horizon to have been at the top for nearly two decades, dominating the Odia film industry throughout the 80's and 90's. His rural fan base led him to do many films which had rustic story lines and from which intellectuals shied away. Many critics and fellow actors and seniors have often expressed in public podium that during the commercially dry days of early nineties of Odia cinema, when the Odia film industry was under heavy financial stress, it was Uttam Mohanty's efforts and charm which saved the day. He is in demand among off-mainstream filmmakers as well. He has won many Odia filmfare awards and prizes as a best actor. A number of societies and institutes have honored him as a living legend of Ollywood cinema.

Awards and accreditation

 Odisha Living Legend Award 2012
 State Film Award as Best actor for Phula Chandana, Jhiati Sita Pari, Danda Balunga, Suna Chadhei
 State Film Award as Best Supporting Actor for To Binu Anyagati nahin.
 Jayadeb Puraskar in 1999
 Awards from Citic Association, Chitrapuri, Banichitra, Chalachitra Jagata
 5th FITFAT Biscope Award, 2008

Filmography

 1977 – Abhimaan
 1978 – Kabi Samrat Upendra Bhanja
 1978 – Pati Patni
 1978 – Sankha Mahuri
 1978 – Sarapancha Babu
 1978 – Danda Balunga
 1978 – Ramayan
 1979 – Chinha Achinha
 1979 – Nijhum Ratira Sathi
 1978 – Ram Balaram
 1981 – Akshay Trutiya
 1981 – Arati
 1981 – Debajani
 1982 – Astaraga
 1982 – Baje Bainshi Nache Ghungura
 1982 – Dekh Khabar Rakh Najar
 1982 – Jwain Pua
 1983 – Abhilasha
 1983 – Jhiatie Sita Pari
 1983 – Ram Rahim
 1984 – Jai Phula
 1984 – Janani
 1985 – Chaka Bhaunri
 1985 – Jaga Hatare Pagha
 1985 – Mamata Mage Mula
 1985 – Palatak
 1985 – Puja Phula
 1985 – Samay Bada Balaban
 1985 – Sankha Sindura
 1986 – Sahari Bagha
 1986 - Sata kebe Luchi rahena
 1986 – School Master
 1986 – Aei Ama Sansara
 1986 – Jor Jar Mulak Tar
 1986 – Paka Kambal Pot Chhata
 1987 – Badhu Nirupama
 1987 – Chaka Akhi Sabu Dekhuchi
 1987 – Aei Ta Duniya
 1987 – Golamgiri
 1987 – Anyaya Sahibi Nahi
 1987 – Michha Mayara Sansara
 1987 – Phula Chandan
 1987 – Suna Chadhei
 1987 – Tunda Baida
 1988 – Thili Jhia Heli Bohu
 1988 – Jahaku Rakhibe Ananta
 1988 – Bada Bhauja
 1988 – Kanyadana
 1988 – Papa Punya
 1988 – Pua Mora Kala Thakura
 1988 –Chaka Dola Karuchi Lila
 1989 – Daiba Daudi
 1989 – Hasa Luha Bhara Duniya
 1989 –Rajanigandha
 1989 – Nyaya Anyaya
 1989 – Paradeshi Chadhei
 1989 – Thakura Achhanti Chau Bahaku
 1990 – Topae Sindura Di Topa Luha
 1990 – Sasti
 1990 – Ja Devi Sarba Bhuteshu
 1990 –Gopare Badhuchi Kala Kanhei
 1990 – Raja Rani
 1990 – Kandhei
 1990 – Panchu Pandav
 1990 – Nua Bhauja
 1990 – Bidhira Bidhan
 1991 – Naya Zaher (Hindi)
 1991 - Aama Ghara Aama Sansara
 1991 – Mukti Tirtha
 1991 – Bastra Haran
 1991 – Akuha Katha
 1991 – Kapala Likhan
 1991 – To Binu Anya Gati Nahi
 1992 – Badshah
 1992 – Bhisma Pratigyan
 1992 – Maa
 1992 – Naga Panchami
 1992 – Sukha Sansara
 1993 – Sukher Swarga
 1993 – Bhagya Hate Dori
 1993 – Dadagiri
 1994 – Akuha Katha
 1994 – Naga Jyoti
 1994 – Pacheri Uthila Majhi Duaru
 1995 – Rakata Kahiba Kie Kahara
 1996 – Pua Mora Bhola Shankar
 1996 – Sakala Tirtha To Charane
 1997 – Lakhe Siba Puji Paichi Pua
 1997 – Nari Bi Pindhi Pare Rakta Sindura
 1997 – Raghu Arakhita
 1998 – Rupa Gaanra Suna Kania
 1998 – Sahara Jaluchi
 1999 – Kala Chakra
 1999 – Maa Pari Kie Haba
 2001 – Baazi
 2001 – Mo Kola To Jhulana
 2002 – Dharma Sahile Hela
 2002 – Samaya Kheluchi Chaka Bhaunri
 2002 – Sei Jhiati
 2005 – Agni Parikshya
 2005 – Om Shanti Om
 2005 – Bazi
 2007 – Ae Jugara Krushna Sudama
 2007 – Mu Tate Love Karuchi
 2007 – Tumaku Paruni Ta Bhuli
 2009 – Romeo – The Lover Boy
 2009 – Ailare Odia Pua
 2009 – Tu Mori Pain
 2009 – Pagala Karichi Paunji Tora
 2017 - Dil ka Raja
 2022 - Bidyarana

Serials
 Katha Kahuthile Saribani
 Panatakani
 Sara akasha
 Uttardai

Notes

External links
 
Uttam Mohanty Website

Living people
Male actors in Bengali cinema
Ollywood
People from Odisha
Male actors in Odia cinema
People from Balrampur
People from Cuttack
1958 births
20th-century Indian male actors
21st-century Indian male actors
Biju Janata Dal politicians